Peter Hackett is an Australian Endurance Championship GT race driver and driving instructor.
He was born in Sydney, resides in Melbourne and has competed in varying Australian motor racing categories since 2000, but has particularly focused on the Australian Endurance Championship in recent years.

After his win at the 2017 Hampton Downs Motorsport Park event, Hackett joined "David Wall and the late Allan Simonsen as the most successful drivers in Australian GT history, with 17-victories to their names."

Early Years
Hackett's first forays into motor racing were not in his home country of Australia, but rather the United Kingdom. From 1995-1997 he raced in various categories including British Formula Vauxhall Junior and British Formula Ford Championship. These early years did not yield any major successes, and Hackett returned home to Australia in the late 90s.
His return to Australia in 20000 saw him compete in Australian Formula 3 and Australian Formula 2 followed by a full season of Formula 3 in 2001 which resulted in Hackett's first Championship victory.

In 2002 he divided his time between Australian Formula 3 and Formula Holden, scoring 1 win and 6th overall in Formula 3 (competing in 8 of 16 races), while finishing 7th in Formula Holden (Competing in 6 of 12 races)

Australian GT Racing
The CAMS sanctioned Australian GT series and the Australian Endurance Championship became Hackett's preferred racing categories and the place where he made his mark.

In 2016 Hackett and team mate Dominic Storey in an Eggleston Motorsport prepared Mercedes-AMG GT3 was second in the CAMS Australian Endurance Championship to Tekno Autosports Grant Denyer and Nathan Morcom.

In 2017 Hackett went one better, winning the CAMS Australian Endurance Championship again alongside team mate and co-driver Dominic Storey.

Driving Instructor
Since 2001, Hackett has served Mercedes-Benz AMG Australasia as its Chief Driving Instructor for performance drive days and track days

As well as his driving instructor duties, Hackett is also an MC for Mercedes Benz vehicle launches, press launches and special events and has been the featured stunt driver in multiple Mercedes Benz/AMG television advertisements and web clips.

Career Highlights Summary

Complete Macau Grand Prix results

Complete Bathurst 24 Hour results

Complete Bathurst 12 Hour results

Controversy
Upon his return to Australian GT Championship in 2016 in Adelaide, Hackett was sensationally excluded from the event after an incident at turn nine where Hackett hit the Audi R8 of James Koundouris. Hackett was excluded after he was found to have breached championship rules 183 section 9 that states ‘any action which causes or is likely to cause damage to other persons or property’. Hackett admitted fault and accepted the CAMS fine of $10,000 with a further $10,000 suspended for the incident.

References

External links

Profile at Australian GT
Driver Database Details for Peter Hackett
SpeedSport Database for Peter Hackett 

1977 births
Living people
Racing drivers from Sydney
Australian Endurance Championship drivers
Australian Formula 3 Championship drivers
Carlin racing drivers